Çobanpınarı (literally "shepherd spring") is a Turkish place name that may refer to the following places in Turkey:

 Çobanpınarı, Bucak
 Çobanpınarı, Gerger, a village in the district of Gerger, Adıyaman Province
 Çobanpınarı, Kozan, a village in the district of Kozan, Adana Province